Ever We Fall was an American alternative rock / emo band from Portland, Oregon.

History
Ever We Fall was formed in Portland in the early 2000s, and signed to Rise Records in 2003 to release their first EP, Endura. While touring the U.S. in support of the album, their bass guitarist left the group, and the band finished the tour as a trio with guitarist Ryan Furlott taking over on bass guitar. In 2004, the group signed with Hopeless Records. The band appeared at the South by Southwest music conference in March 2005 as part of a Hopeless Records showcase. They went on a Canadian tour with Kaddisfly in July 2005. In November 2005, We Are But Human was announced for release the following year; it appeared on February 21, 2006. Between March and May 2006, they embarked on a cross-country tour of the US.

Ever We Fall has toured with groups including Kaddisfly, Small Towns Burn A Little Slower and Life Before This.

The song "Youth Like Tigers" was featured on the Teenage Mutant Ninja Turtles soundtrack in March 2007.

During July 2008, the band officially announced on their MySpace page that they had broken up and had no intention to reunite.

Members
Final members at break-up
Adam Brazie - vocals, guitar
Ryan Furlott - guitar (bass guitar during the later half of their Rise Records tour)
Matthew Szklarz - drums

Former members
Ian Fike - bass guitar (now the vocalist of Portland group It Prevails)
Ben Klenz - bass guitar (recorded with the group on Endura)
Jay Turk - bass guitar (with the band from 2005–2006, recorded with the group on We Are But Human)
Aaron James - bass guitar (with the band during their 2006-2007 tour across the US)

Discography
Endura (Rise Records, 2004)
We Are But Human (Hopeless Records, 2006)

References

External links
Official website
Official MySpace
Official Purevolume

Musical groups from Portland, Oregon
American emo musical groups
Rise Records artists
2000 establishments in Oregon
2008 disestablishments in Oregon
Musical groups established in 2000
Musical groups disestablished in 2008
Hopeless Records artists